The 2015 UCLA Bruins football team represented the University of California, Los Angeles in the 2015 NCAA Division I FBS football season. The Bruins were coached by fourth-year head coach Jim Mora and played their home games at the Rose Bowl in Pasadena, California. They were members of the South Division of the Pac-12 Conference. The Bruins finished the season 8–5, including 5–4 in conference play to finish third in the South Division, and outscored their opponents by a combined total of 419 to 338.

Previous season

The team finished the season as the No. 10 ranked team in the country with 10 wins, including a 40–35 win over the Kansas State Wildcats in the 2015 Alamo Bowl. The Bruins were led by quarterback Brett Hundley, running back Paul Perkins and linebacker Eric Kendricks. The team defeated the cross-town rival USC Trojans for three straight years, this time 38–20 on November 22, 2014 in the Rose Bowl.

Preseason

Recruiting

Roster

On August 14, 2015, UCLA announced that freshman wide receiver Cordell Broadus had left the UCLA football team, "[deciding] to pursue other passions in his life."

Schedule

Game summaries

Virginia

UCLA freshman quarterback Josh Rosen completed 28 of 35 passes for 351 yards and three touchdowns in a 34–16 win over Virginia. The No. 13 Bruins gained 503 yard in total offense as Rosen completed passes to 11 different receivers. UCLA did not allow a touchdown until the final minutes of the game.

The nation's top quarterback recruit, Rosen was taking over for three-year starter Brett Hundley, who had left for the National Football League (NFL). On the first play, the freshman threw a perfect 55-yard pass to Kenneth Walker III, who dropped the pass. The drive stalled, but Rosen completed seven consecutive passes at the end of the quarter, including a scoring pass to Devin Fuller. In the middle of the second quarter, Rosen connected with Thomas Duarte on a 30-yard pass placed over the defender's shoulder and into his receiver's hands. Two defenders playing on offense scored for UCLA in the third. Linebacker Myles Jack, who also spends some time at running back, scored on a run, and defensive tackle Kenny Clark caught a scoring pass late in the quarter. Virginia, who had been limited to three field goals, scored their only touchdown with 3:29 left in the game.

The Cavaliers had been selected to finish last among seven teams in the Atlantic Coast Conference's Coastal Division, and lost six of seven games dating back to the previous season. Rosen was honored as the Walter Camp Offensive Player of the Week.

UNLV

BYU

#16 Arizona

Arizona State

#15 Stanford

#20 California

Colorado

Oregon State

Washington State

#18 Utah

USC

Nebraska

Coaches
 Jim L. Mora, Head coach
 Noel Mazzone, Offensive coordinator/Quarterbacks
 Adrian Klemm, Associate head coach/Running game coordinator/Offensive Line
 Tom Bradley, Defensive coordinator (new to UCLA)
 Demetrice Martin, Assistant head coach, Defense/Secondary
 Kennedy Polamalu, Running backs
 Scott White, Linebackers/Special teams
 Eric Yarber, Wide receivers
 Angus McClure, Defensive line/Recruiting coordinator
 Taylor Mazzone, Quarterbacks coach
 Sal Alosi, Coordinator of strength & conditioning

Rankings

Awards and honors

National awards
Lou Groza Award: Ka'imi Fairbairn

Foster Farms Bowl MVP: Jaleel Wadood

All-American teams
The following Pac-12 players were named to the 2015 College Football All-America Team by the Walter Camp Football Foundation (WCFF), Associated Press (AP), Football Writers Association of America (FWAA), Sporting News, and American Football Coaches Association (AFCA):
First team
Ka'imi Fairbairn, K (WCFF, AP, FWAA, AFCA)

Second team
Ka'imi Fairbairn, K, (SN)

Third team
Kenny Clark (AP)

Conference awards
Pac-12 Freshman Offensive Player of the Year: Josh Rosen

All-conference teams
The following players were named to the All-Pac-12 team.
First team
Kenny Clark, DL

Second team

Honorable mention
Jordan Payton, WR
Aaron Wallace, LB
Marcus Rios, DB

2016 NFL draft
The following players were drafted into professional football following the season.

Notes
 February 24, 2015 – Outside Linebackers/Special Teams Coach Mike Tuiasosopo was not retained
 March 16, 2015 – Offensive line coach Adrian Klemm was suspended for alleged rules violation
 August 25, 2015 – Freshman Josh Rosen was named the starting quarterback
 October 31, 2015 – The 1965 team was honored as co-captains at the Cal game as part of its 50th anniversary celebration

References

External links

 2014 UCLA Bruins Stats at Sports-Reference.com

UCLA
UCLA Bruins football seasons
2015 in Los Angeles
UCLA Bruins football